Anthony Lavonne Covington (born December 26, 1967 in Winston-Salem, North Carolina) is a former American football safety in the National Football League and Arena Football League. He was drafted by the Tampa Bay Buccaneers in the fourth round of the 1991 NFL Draft. He played college football at Virginia.

Covington also played for the Seattle Seahawks and Tampa Bay Storm.

He currently works as the radio color commentator for University of Virginia football broadcasts.

External links
Tampa Bay Buccaneers bio
Tampa Bay Storm bio

1967 births
Living people
Players of American football from Winston-Salem, North Carolina
American football safeties
Virginia Cavaliers football players
Tampa Bay Buccaneers players
Seattle Seahawks players
Tampa Bay Storm players
Ed Block Courage Award recipients